A total lunar eclipse will take place on Tuesday, March 3, 2026, the first of two lunar eclipses in 2026.

This eclipse is the third of an almost tetrad, with others being 14 Mar 2025 (T), 07 Sep 2025 (T) and 28 Aug 2026 (P).

Visibility
It will be completely visible over the Pacific, western USA and Canada, and New Zealand, will be seen rising over Australia and Asia, and setting over the rest of the Americas.

Related eclipses

Eclipses in 2026
 An annular solar eclipse on 17 February.
 A total lunar eclipse on 3 March.
 A total solar eclipse on 12 August.
 A partial lunar eclipse on 28 August.

Lunar year series

Saros series
This lunar eclipse is part of series 133 of the Saros cycle, which repeats every 18 years and 11 days. Series 133 runs from the year 1557 until 2819. The previous eclipse of this series occurred on 21 February 2008 and the next will occur on 13 March 2044.

It is the 7th of 21 total lunar eclipses in series 133. The first was on 28 December 1917. The last (21st) will be on 3 August 2278. The longest two occurrences of this series (14th and 15th) will last for a total of 1 hour and 42 minutes on 18 May 2152 and 30 May 2170. Solar saros 140 interleaves with this lunar saros with an event occurring every 9 years 5 days alternating between each saros series.

Metonic cycle (19 years)

Inex series

Half-Saros cycle
A lunar eclipse will be preceded and followed by solar eclipses by 9 years and 5.5 days (a half saros). This lunar eclipse is related to two annular solar eclipses of Solar Saros 140.

See also
List of lunar eclipses and List of 21st-century lunar eclipses

References

External links
Saros cycle 133

2026-03
2026-03
2026 in science